Kevin Behrens (born 3 February 1991) is a German professional footballer who plays as a forward for Bundesliga club Union Berlin.

Career
In April 2018, Behrens signed a three-year contract for SV Sandhausen, having joined on a free transfer from 1. FC Saarbrücken.

References

External links

1991 births
Living people
Footballers from Bremen
German footballers
Association football forwards
SV Wilhelmshaven players
Hannover 96 II players
Alemannia Aachen players
Rot-Weiss Essen players
1. FC Saarbrücken players
SV Sandhausen players
1. FC Union Berlin players
Bundesliga players
2. Bundesliga players
Regionalliga players